Yu Xie (born 1959) is a Chinese-American sociologist and a sociology professor at Princeton University. He joined the University of Michigan as an assistant professor in 1989 and served as a professor from 1996 to 2015.

Xie has made contributions to quantitative methodology, social stratification, demography, Chinese studies, sociology of science, and social science data collection. He was Otis Dudley Duncan Distinguished University Professor of Sociology, Statistics, and Public Policy at the University of Michigan. He is a member of the American Academy of Arts and Sciences, Academia Sinica, and the National Academy of Sciences.

Biography 

Xie was born in Zhenjiang, Jiangsu, China in 1959, the second of two brothers. His parents were both physicians. Xie’s education was delayed by the Cultural Revolution in China, and his family suffered many hardships, but after the Revolution ended, he was accepted at Shanghai University of Technology, where he received a B.S. in Metallurgical Engineering in 1982. He then came to the United States to study at the University of Wisconsin-Madison, from which he received an M.A. in the History of Science and an M.S. in Sociology in 1984 as well as a Ph.D. in Sociology in 1989. After completing his doctorate, Xie came to the University of Michigan as an assistant professor, where he was appointed associate professor in 1994 and full professor in 1996. He became an American citizen in 1997. Xie now lives in Ann Arbor with his wife and their two children.

Along with his sociology appointment, Xie has held various positions in other departments at the University of Michigan. He was appointed Professor of Statistics in 2000 and Professor of Public Policy in 2011. Xie is also a Research Professor at the Population Studies Center and the Survey Research Center of the Institute for Social Research, and a Faculty Associate at the Center for Chinese Studies. Since 1999, he has been directing the Quantitative Methodology Program at the Survey Research Center. During his over twenty years of career at the University of Michigan, Xie held multiple chair professorships. In 2007, he was appointed Otis Dudley Duncan University Distinguished Professor.

Xie has been active in promoting empirical sociology in China. His primary institutional affiliation in China has been with Peking University, where he has directed the China Family Panel Studies (CFPS), China’s largest national longitudinal social science data collection project  and founded the Social Research Center. Xie has also been active at several other institutions in China, holding honorary adjunct professorships at Renmin University of China, Hong Kong University of Science and Technology, Chinese University of Hong Kong, and Shanghai University.

Professional recognition 

 Fellowship Invitation, Center for Advanced Study in the Behavioral Sciences (1990).
 Spencer Fellowship, National Academy of Education (1991-1992).
 Young Investigator Award, National Science Foundation (1992-1997).
 Faculty Scholar Award, William T. Grant Foundation (1994-1999).
 Member, Sociological Research Association (1997).
 Chair, Section on Sociological Methodology, the American Sociological Association (2001-2003).
 Guggenheim Fellowship, John Simon Guggenheim Memorial Foundation (2002-2003).
 Fellow, American Academy of Arts and Science (2004).
 Academician, Academia Sinica, Taiwan (2004).
 Distinguished Lecturer Award, the Center for the Study of Women, Science, and Technology (WST), Georgia Institute of Technology (2006).
 Clifford C. Clogg Award, Population Association of America (2008).
 Zhu Kezhen Distinguished Lecturer, Zhejiang University, China (2008).
 Member, National Academy of Sciences (2009).
 Wei-Lun Visiting Professorship, Chinese University of Hong Kong (2010).
 The Henry and Bryna David Lecture at the National Research Council (April 2013).

Books 

 Powers, Daniel A. and Yu Xie. 2000. Statistical Methods for Categorical Data Analysis. New York: Academic Press.
 Powers, Daniel A. and Yu Xie. 2008. Statistical Methods for Categorical Data Analysis, Second Edition. Howard House, England: Emerald.
 Chinese translation: 《分类数据分析的统计方法》（第2版）. 北京: 社会科学文献出版社, 2009.
 Xie, Yu and Kimberlee A. Shauman. 2003. Women in Science: Career Processes and Outcomes. Cambridge, MA: Harvard University Press.
 Reviewed in Science (2003), Nature (2004), Choice (2004), and Contemporary Sociology (2005).
 2005 Choice Magazine Outstanding Academic Title.
 Xie, Yu and Kimberly Goyette. 2004. A Demographic Portrait of Asian Americans. New York: Russell Sage Foundation and Population Reference Bureau.
 Scott, Jacqueline L. and Yu Xie (editors). 2005. Quantitative Social Science, Sage Benchmarks in Social Research Methods. London: Sage.
 Xie, Yu. 2006. Sociological Methodology and Quantitative Research 《社会学方法与定量研究》(in Chinese). Social Sciences Academic Press. Beijing, China. 社会科学文献出版社.
 Thornton, Arland, William Axinn, and Yu Xie. 2007. Marriage and Cohabitation. Chicago: University of Chicago Press.
 2008 Outstanding Publication Award of the Section on Aging and the Life Course of the American Sociological Association.
 Xie, Yu (Editor). 2007. Sociological Methodology Vol. 37. Washington D.C.: American Sociological Association.
 Xie, Yu (Editor). 2008. Sociological Methodology Vol. 38. Washington D.C.: American Sociological Association.
 Xie, Yu (Editor). 2009. Sociological Methodology Vol. 39. Washington D.C.: American Sociological Association.
 Xie, Yu. 2010. Regression Analysis 《回归分析》(in Chinese). Social Sciences Academic Press. Beijing, China. 社会科学文献出版社.
 Xie, Yu and Alexandra A. Killewald. 2012. Is American Science in Decline?'' Harvard University Press.

References 

1959 births
Living people
University of Michigan faculty
Scientists from Zhenjiang
Shanghai University of Technology alumni
University of Wisconsin–Madison College of Letters and Science alumni
Academic staff of Peking University
American sociologists
Chinese sociologists
Chinese emigrants to the United States
Fellows of the American Academy of Arts and Sciences
Members of Academia Sinica
Members of the United States National Academy of Sciences
Princeton University faculty